Naeem U. Hasan is a Pakistani diplomat who served as the sixth secretary-general of the South Asian Association for Regional Cooperation (SAARC) from January 1, 1996 to December 31, 1998.

Prior to being nominated as the secretary-general, he served as Ambassador of Pakistan in Syria stationed at Damascus between 1990 and 1995. He retired in May 2001 as Ambassador of Pakistan in Stockholm, Sweden.

References

Secretaries General of the South Asian Association for Regional Cooperation
Ambassadors of Pakistan to Syria
Ambassadors of Pakistan to Sweden
Living people
Year of birth missing (living people)